Keld Kristensen (born 16 January 1952) is a Danish football manager and former player who works as a scout. During his playing career, he featured as a right-back for B 1903 and B93. He most notably managed F.C. Copenhagen.

Playing career
Kristensen played most of his career at B 1903. Between 1970 and 1972 he played six games for various Denmark national youth sides. He scored one goal against the Netherlands under-19s on 8 August 1970.

Coaching career
As a manager, he started in his old club B 1903. Later he returned to the club as assistant for Benny Johansen. When B 1903 merged with Kjøbenhavns Boldklub to form F.C. Copenhagen in 1992, Kristensen continued as Johansen's assistant. When Johansen stopped as manager in 1994, Kristensen was named new head coach. The club had a terrible start to the 1994-1995 season: In the UEFA Cup they only barely defeated Finnish side FC Jazz Pori, and after five games in the Superliga the club had lost three games and drawn two. Due to the bad results the board chose to sack Kristensen and replaced him with Johansen.

Honours

Player
B 1903
 Danish championship: 1969, 1970, 1976; runner-up 1972, 1977
 Danish Cup: 1979

B93
 Danish Cup: 1982

References

External links
Keld Kristensen's Personal homepage

1952 births
Living people
People from Gladsaxe Municipality
Danish men's footballers
Denmark youth international footballers
Denmark under-21 international footballers
Association football fullbacks
Boldklubben af 1893 players
Danish football managers
F.C. Copenhagen managers
Sportspeople from the Capital Region of Denmark